The Hybrid Electric Train (HET) is a hybrid electric train built by the Department of Science and Technology's Metals Industry Research and Development Center.

It is the first train crafted and designed locally by Filipino engineers with parts imported from abroad. It was officially turned over to the Philippine National Railways on June 20, 2019.

Background 
The development of the Hybrid Electric Train (HET) is a project of the Metals Industry Research and Development Center (MIRDC) of the Philippine Department of Science and Technology in partnership with the Philippine National Railways (PNR).

The Hybrid Electric Train project began in 2012, and the designing of the train commenced in the following year. The bidding process took place in 2013, with the manufacturing taking place from 2014 to 2015. The project was introduced to the public in June 2016.

The train was developed by ten Filipino engineers and technicians from MIRDC led by head engineer Pablo Acuin.

Specifications 
The Hybrid Electric Train is a hybrid electric vehicle powered by electricity and diesel. It has 260 lead acid batteries which is used to run the train and operate its automatic doors, air-conditioning and CCTV systems. It can be converted to utilize lithium battery. It also makes use of regenerative braking technology.

Four of its cars serve as passenger coaches with one having a driver's cabin, while the other car not mentioned solely serves as a generator car that also includes a driver's cabin.

The train also has an automatic stop safety feature that would activate in an event of a strong earthquake.

The MIRDC contracted local bus and truck manufacturer Fil-Asia Automotive and Industries Corp. to build the train. Fil-Asia in turn outsourced the motor, chassis, engine, motor, axle, and wheels from outside of the Philippines to be able to manufacture it.

The trainset formation is Tc-T-T-T-Mc in which one of the two cabs are the power cars. The Tc car is described as a pilot car, the T cars are described as passenger cars, and the Mc car is described as a power car.

Operational history 
Trial runs of the Hybrid Electric Train was conducted in July 2018. The first commercial operations of the Hybrid Electric Train began on May 6, 2019, where it served the Alabang-Calamba Line thrice a day.
The train was officially turned over to the Philippine National Railways on June 20, 2019. After a brief hiatus in service, the train returned to service on November 11, 2021 for free rides between Biñan and Calamba stations. The free rides ended on December 3, 2021, and the hybrid electric train has not made any known public appearances since then.

Future
According to DOST Secretary Fortunato de la Peña, the DOST will find private sector firms that will manufacture the rolling stock of the HET before Rodrigo Duterte ends his term as President in 2022.

See also
DOST Hybrid Electric Road Train

References

Rolling stock of the Philippines
Proposed public transportation in the Philippines
Department of Science and Technology (Philippines)